Dearborn may refer to:

People
 Dearborn (surname)
 Henry Dearborn (1751–1829), U.S. Secretary of War under President Thomas Jefferson, Senior Officer of the U.S. Army during the War of 1812

Places in the United States

Forts
 Fort Dearborn, a frontier era fort in present-day Chicago, Illinois
 Fort Dearborn (Mississippi), in Washington, Mississippi
 Fort Dearborn (New Hampshire), in present-day Odiorne State Park
 Detroit Arsenal at Dearbornville

Populated places

Michigan
 Dearborn, Michigan, formerly Dearbornville
 Dearborn Heights, Michigan
 Dearborn Township, Michigan, 1833–1960; See M-153 (Michigan highway)

Other states
 Dearborn, Missouri
 Dearborn County, Indiana

Other places
 Dearborn River, Montana
 Dearborn School, in Boston, Massachusetts

See also
 Dearborne